Leukocyte immunoglobulin-like receptor subfamily B member 1 is a protein that in humans is encoded by the LILRB1 gene.

Function 

This gene is a member of the leukocyte immunoglobulin-like receptor (LIR) family, which is found in a gene cluster at chromosomal region 19q13.4. The encoded protein belongs to the subfamily B class of LIR receptors which contain two or four extracellular immunoglobulin domains, a transmembrane domain, and two to four cytoplasmic immunoreceptor tyrosine-based inhibitory motifs (ITIMs). The receptor is expressed on immune cells where it binds to MHC class I molecules on antigen-presenting cells and transduces a negative signal that inhibits stimulation of an immune response. It is thought to control inflammatory responses and cytotoxicity to help focus the immune response and limit autoreactivity. Multiple transcript variants encoding different isoforms have been found for this gene.

See also 
 Cluster of differentiation

References

Further reading

External links 
 

Clusters of differentiation
Immunoglobulin superfamily